BFB may refer to:

Entertainment
Blood for Blood (band), U.S. hardcore punk band
"Best Friend's Brother", a 2011 single by Victoria Justice
Brutal Flying Behemoth, a type of Bloon in the Bloons Tower Defense video game franchise.

Transportation
Benjamin Franklin Bridge (Delaware River Bridge) a bridge over the Delaware River connecting Philadelphia to Camden
 Boeing BFB, a US Navy carrier fighter-bomber
Bulleid Firth Brown wheel, a type of locomotive wheel used on Britain's Southern Railway

Other uses
Bacterial fruit blotch, cucurbit plant infection
Bubbling fluidized bed combustion
Breakage-Fusion-Bridge, a biological process inducing genome instability

See also 

 
 
 Blood for Blood (disambiguation)